Andrea Alföldi Rejtő (born September 22, 1964 in Komló, Baranya) is a retired female race walker from Hungary, who competed for her native country at the 1992 Summer Olympics in Barcelona, Spain. She set her personal best (43.41) in the women's 10 km event in 1992.

Achievements

References

External links
 
 
 
 

1964 births
Living people
Hungarian female racewalkers
Athletes (track and field) at the 1992 Summer Olympics
Olympic athletes of Hungary
People from Komló
Competitors at the 1991 Summer Universiade
Sportspeople from Baranya County
20th-century Hungarian women